Glee is an American musical comedy-drama television series produced by Fox. It focuses on the glee club New Directions, at the fictional William McKinley High School in Lima, Ohio. The show was created by Ryan Murphy, Brad Falchuk and Ian Brennan, and features many cover versions of songs sung on-screen by the characters. Murphy is responsible for selecting all of the songs used, and strives to maintain a balance between show tunes and chart hits, as he wants there to be "something for everybody in every episode." Once Murphy selects a song, rights are cleared with its publishers by music supervisor P.J. Bloom, and music producer Adam Anders rearranges it for the Glee cast. Numbers are pre-recorded by the cast, while choreographer Zach Woodlee constructs the accompanying dance moves, which are then taught to the cast and filmed. Studio recordings of tracks are then made. The process begins six to eight weeks before each episode is filmed, and can end as late as the day before filming begins. The list below contains all 136 musical performances of the fourth season, with each performance delivering an individual song or a mashup of two or more songs in a single performance.

Songs

See also
 List of songs in Glee (season 1)
 List of songs in Glee (season 2)
 List of songs in Glee (season 3)
 List of songs in Glee (season 5)
 List of songs in Glee (season 6)
 Glee albums discography

Notes

References

General
Singles: 
All releases: 

Specific

Glee